Vieille-Église is a commune in the Pas-de-Calais department in the Hauts-de-France region of France.

Geography
Vieille-Église is located 9 miles (15 km) east of Calais, at the D229 and D255 road junction, just a hundred yards from the A16 autoroute.

Population

Places of interest
 The church of Saint Omer, dating from the nineteenth century.

See also
Communes of the Pas-de-Calais department

References

Vieilleeglise
Pale of Calais